Gymnochilini is a tribe of beetles in the subfamily Trogossitinae.

References 

 Leschen, R.A.B.; Lackner, T. 2013: Gondwanan Gymnochilini (Coleoptera: Trogossitidae): generic concepts, review of New Zealand species and long-range Pacific dispersal. Systematic entomology, 38(2): 278–304,  

Trogossitidae
Beetle tribes